San Bernardo is a station on Line 2 and Line 4 of the Madrid Metro. It is located in fare Zone A.

History
The station was opened on 21 October 1925 as part of Line 2.

On 24 March 1944 it was expanded to include platforms for Line 4.

References 

Line 2 (Madrid Metro) stations
Line 4 (Madrid Metro) stations
Railway stations in Spain opened in 1925